Edward Joseph Ducy (February 4, 1920 – December 9, 2008) was an American Negro league second baseman in the 1940s.

A native of New Orleans, Louisiana, Ducy was the younger brother of fellow Negro leaguer Ralph Ducy. He played for the Homestead Grays in 1947, and died in Los Angeles, California in 2008 at age 88.

References

External links
 and Seamheads

1920 births
2008 deaths
Homestead Grays players
Baseball second basemen
Baseball players from New Orleans
20th-century African-American sportspeople
21st-century African-American people